Aichele is a German surname. Notable people with the surname include:

Carol Aichele (born 1950), American politician
Erwin Aichele (1887–1974), German painter
Hans Aichele (1911–1948), Swiss bobsledder
Stephen S. Aichele (born 1948), American lawyer and politician
Wolfram Aichele (1924–2016), German artist

German-language surnames